Hatton is a civil parish and hamlet in the Borough of Warrington, Cheshire, England, located to the south of Warrington town centre.

It lies on the B5356 road between the villages of Daresbury and Stretton.  It has one public house, The Hatton Arms.  This is a Grade II listed building which formerly incorporated a post office and a village store. Two other listed buildings are Hatton Hall and a K6 telephone kiosk designed by Giles Gilbert Scott.

See also

Listed buildings in Hatton, Warrington

References

External links
 Hatton - The village with a big community spirit

Civil parishes in Warrington
Villages in Cheshire